Discomycetes is a former taxonomic class of Ascomycete fungi which contains all of the cup, sponge and brain fungi and some club-like fungi. It includes typical cup fungi like the scarlet elf cup and the orange peel fungus, and fungi with fruiting bodies of more unusual shape, such as morels, truffles and the swamp beacon. New taxonomic and molecular data fail to support the monophyly of the discomycetes.

A common feature of Discomycetes are the asci, which are typically produced on the surface of cup-like fruiting bodies. In most discomycetes, each ascus contains eight sexual spores that are forcibly discharged into the air when mature.
In modern classifications, the members of the obsolete class are included in Pezizomycetes, Lecanoromycetes, Leotiomycetes and Sordariomycetes.

References

External links 
 The Discomycetes project at Harvard University (mainly Pezizales)
  Synoptic keys to the inoperculate stromatic discomycetes in the Nordic countries: Sclerotiniaceae & Rutstroemiaceae

Ascomycota
Obsolete fungus taxa